aka Tora-san's Love Song is a 1971 Japanese comedy film directed by Yoji Yamada. It stars Kiyoshi Atsumi as Torajirō Kuruma (Tora-san), and Junko Ikeuchi as his love interest or "Madonna". Tora-san's Love Call is the eighth entry in the popular, long-running Otoko wa Tsurai yo series.

Synopsis
Hoping to find rest from his wandering life, Tora-san returns home. He becomes infatuated with a widow and leaves to travel again, keeping his feelings secret.

Cast
 Kiyoshi Atsumi as Torajirō
 Chieko Baisho as Sakura
 Takashi Shimura as Hyōichirō Suwa (Hiroshi's father)
 Shin Morikawa as Tatsuzō (Torajiro's uncle)
 Chishū Ryū as Gozen-sama
 Gin Maeda as Hiroshi Suwa
 Yasukiyo Umeno as Tsuyoshi Suwa
 Takanobu Hozumi as Osamu Suwa
 Yoshio Yoshida as Director of travelling company of actors
 Chieko Misaki as Torajiro's aunt
 Hisao Dazai as Tarō Ume

Critical appraisal

For his work on Tora-san's Love Call, and the previous two entries in the Otoko wa Tsurai yo series, Tora-san, the Good Samaritan, and Tora-san's Shattered Romance (all 1971), Yoji Yamada tied for Best Director at the Mainichi Film Awards with Masahiro Shinoda. The German-language site molodezhnaja gives Tora-san's Love Call three and a half out of five stars.

Availability
Tora-san's Love Call was released theatrically on November 20, 1971. In Japan, the film was released on videotape in 1983 and 1995, and in DVD format in 1995 and 2008.

References

Bibliography

English

German

Japanese

External links
 Tora-san's Love Call at www.tora-san.jp (official site)

1971 films
Films directed by Yoji Yamada
1971 comedy films
1970s Japanese-language films
Otoko wa Tsurai yo films
Japanese sequel films
Shochiku films
Films with screenplays by Yôji Yamada
1970s Japanese films